The 2008–09 Czech First League, known as the Gambrinus liga for sponsorship reasons, was the sixteenth season of Czech Republic's top-tier of football. It began on 2 August 2008 and ended on 30 May 2009. Slavia Prague were the defending champions. Slavia secured their 17th title overall after a 3–1 win away against Viktoria Žižkov in 28th round. They were the first club to defend Czech title since the 2000–01 season.

Promotion and relegation
Most and Bohemians 1905 were relegated to the second division after finishing last and second to last, respectively, in the previous season.

FK Bohemians Prague (Střížkov) (as champions) and 1. FK Příbram (as runners-up) were promoted from the second division.

Stadia and locations

Managerial changes

 Zlin manager Josef Mazura was relieved of his duties after the 7th round of matches; Ladislav Minář took over as caretaker manager until the appointment of Stanislav Levý before the 12th round.
 Brno appointed Aleš Křeček to the position of caretaker manager after the 11th round of matches until Miroslav Beránek took over in the winter break.

League table

Results

Top goalscorers
Source: fotbal.idnes.cz

See also
 2008–09 Czech Cup
 2008–09 Czech 2. Liga

References 

 Statistics of the 2008-2009 season at iDNES.cz

Czech First League seasons
Czech
1